Squamous-cell carcinoma of the thyroid (SCT), or thyroid squamous-cell carcinoma, is rare malignant neoplasm of thyroid gland which shows tumor cells with distinct squamous differentiation. The incidence of SCT is less than 1% out of thyroid malignancies.

Pathophysiology 
Squamous epithelial cells are not found in normal thyroid, thus the origin of SCT is not clear. However, it might be a derived from the embryonic remnants such as thyroglossal duct or branchial clefts. Often SCT is diagnosed in one of the thyroid lobes, but not in the pyramidal lobe. Another possible way of SCT development can be through the squamous metaplasia of cells. However, that theory is also controversial, since the Hashimoto's thyroiditis and chronic lymphocytic thyroiditis (neoplasms to be showed squamous metaplasia) are not associated with SCT. Primary STC is usually diagnosed in both lobes of thyroid gland. The histopathology of STC shows a squamous differentiation of tumor cells.

Diagnosis 
Squamous-cell carcinoma of the thyroid is biologically aggressive malignant neoplasm which is associated with rapid growth of neck mass followed by infiltration of thyroid-adjacent structures.
Patients usually demonstrate dysphagia, dyspnea and voice changes, as well as local pain in the neck.

Fine-needle aspiration cytology 
Ultrasound-guided fine-needle aspiration should be performed for verification of SCT.

Radiological examination 
There are no specific radiological tests for SCT verification. However these tests might be useful for identification of tumor borders and in planning of surgery.

Markers 
Immunohistochemistry is performed as additional test. The strong positive expression of cytokeratin 19 was shown in primary SCT, and negative in metastatic SCT.

Treatment 
Thyroidectomy and neck dissection show good results in early stages of SCT. However, due to highly aggressive phenotype, surgical treatment is not always possible. The SCT is a radioiodine-refractory tumor. Radiotherapy might be effective in certain cases, resulting in relatively better survival rate and quality of life. Vincristine, doxorubicin and bleomycin are used for adjuvant chemotherapy, but their effects are not good enough according to publications.

Prognosis 
Squamous-cell carcinoma of the thyroid exhibits a highly aggressive phenotype, thus prognosis of that malignancy is extremely poor. The overall survival is less than 1 year in most of cases.

References

External links 

Thyroid cancer
Rare cancers